Gabriele Albertini (born 6 July 1950 in Milan) is an Italian politician.

Biography
In 1974 he Graduated in Law from the University of Milan. He was the Manager of Albertini Cesare Spa, a company working in the aluminium pressure die casting sector, from 1974 to 1997. In 1987 he became a delegate for small business on the executive board of Federmeccanica (the Italian Mechanical Engineers' Trade Union Federation) and in 1996 he became its Chairman (until 1997).

In 1997 he was elected Mayor of Milan, with the support of the centre-right coalition, and held office until 2006.

In the 2004 European election and in the subsequent 2009 EP election he was elected MEP. He was a member of the European People's Party's group, and sat on the European Parliament's Committee on Transport and Tourism. He was also a delegate on the Committee on Industry, Research and Energy, Vice-Chair of the Delegation for Relations at NATO's Parliamentary Assembly and a member of the EU's Delegation for Relations with the United States.

In 2013 he ran for President of the Lombardy region, supported by a centrist coalition, but he got only the 4.12% of the vote. In the same year he was elected Senator on the Civic Choice list.

Decorations
 Order of Friendship of the Russian Federation
 Grand Cordon of the Order of Independence of the Kingdom of Jordan
 Officer of the Legion of Honour of the French Republic
 Knight Grand Cross of the Royal Norwegian Order of Merit
 Grand Officer of the Order of Merit of the Grand Duchy of Luxembourg
 Grand Officer of the Order of Saints Maurice and Lazarus
 Silver Cross of Merit of the Equestrian Order of the Holy Sepulchre of Jerusalem
 Grand Officer of the Order pro Merito Melitensi of the Sovereign Military Order of Malta
 Commander of Merit of the Sacred Military Constantinian Order of Saint George
 Honorary Knight Commander of the Most Excellent Order of the British Empire
Grand Officer of the Order of Prince Henry (31 January 2005)

Electoral history

See also
 2009 European Parliament election in Italy

References

External links
 
 
 www.parlamento17.openpolis.it

1950 births
Civic Choice politicians
Forza Italia MEPs
Grand Cordons of the Order of Independence (Jordan)
Grand Officers of the Order of Merit of the Grand Duchy of Luxembourg
Grand Officers of the Order of Saints Maurice and Lazarus
Honorary Knights Commander of the Order of the British Empire
Living people
Mayors of Milan
Members of the Senate of the Republic (Italy)
MEPs for Italy 2009–2014
MEPs for Italy 2004–2009
21st-century Italian politicians
New Centre-Right politicians
Officiers of the Légion d'honneur
Recipients of the Order pro Merito Melitensi
The People of Freedom MEPs
University of Milan alumni
Knights of the Holy Sepulchre